The Whitewater Avenue Commercial Historic District is a small historic district in St. Charles, Minnesota, United States.  It consists of a row of seven buildings stretching one and a half blocks along the west side of Whitewater Avenue.  They were built between 1890 and 1901.  The district was listed on the National Register of Historic Places in 1984 for having local significance in the theme of architecture.  It was nominated for its strong visual cohesion, representing a pinnacle of commercial architecture in St. Charles.

See also
 National Register of Historic Places listings in Winona County, Minnesota

References

External links
 

Buildings and structures in Winona County, Minnesota
Commercial buildings on the National Register of Historic Places in Minnesota
Historic districts on the National Register of Historic Places in Minnesota
National Register of Historic Places in Winona County, Minnesota